In aerodynamics, wing loading is the total mass of an aircraft or flying animal divided by the area of its wing. The stalling speed of an aircraft in straight, level flight is partly determined by its wing loading. An aircraft or animal with a low wing loading has a larger wing area relative to its mass, as compared to one with a high wing loading.

The faster an aircraft flies, the more lift can be produced by each unit of wing area, so a smaller wing can carry the same mass in level flight. Consequently, faster aircraft generally have higher wing loadings than slower aircraft. This increased wing loading also increases takeoff and landing distances. A higher wing loading also decreases maneuverability. The same constraints apply to winged biological organisms.

Range of wing loadings

Effect on performance
Wing loading is a useful measure of the stalling speed of an aircraft. Wings generate lift owing to the motion of air around the wing. Larger wings move more air, so an aircraft with a large wing area relative to its mass (i.e., low wing loading) will have a lower stalling speed. Therefore, an aircraft with lower wing loading will be able to take off and land at a lower speed (or be able to take off with a greater load). It will also be able to turn at a greater rate.

Effect on takeoff and landing speeds
The lift force L on a wing of area A, traveling at true airspeed v is given by

, 

where ρ is the density of air and CL is the lift coefficient. The lift coefficient is a dimensionless number which depends on the wing cross-sectional profile and the angle of attack. At steady flight, neither climbing nor diving, the lift force and the weight are equal.  With L/A = Mg/A =WSg, where M is the aircraft mass, WS = M/A the wing loading (in mass/area units, i.e. lb/ft2 or kg/m2, not force/area) and g the acceleration due to gravity, that equation gives the speed v through

 .
So if an aircraft's wing area is increased by 10% and nothing else is changed, the takeoff speed will fall by about 5%. Likewise, if an aircraft designed to take off at 150 mph grows in weight during development by 40%, its takeoff speed increases to  = 177 mph.

Some flyers rely on their muscle power to gain speed for takeoff over land or water. Ground nesting and water birds have to be able to run or paddle at their takeoff speed before they can take off. The same is true for a hang glider pilot, though they may get assistance from a downhill run.  For all these, a low WS is critical, whereas passerines and cliff dwelling birds can get airborne with higher wing loadings.

Effect on turning performance
To turn, an aircraft must roll in the direction of the turn, increasing the aircraft's bank angle. Turning flight lowers the wing's lift component against gravity and hence causes a descent. To compensate, the lift force must be increased by increasing the angle of attack by use of up elevator deflection which increases drag. Turning can be described as 'climbing around a circle' (wing lift is diverted to turning the aircraft) so the increase in wing angle of attack creates even more drag. The tighter the turn radius attempted, the more drag induced; this requires that power (thrust) be added to overcome the drag. The maximum rate of turn possible for a given aircraft design is limited by its wing size and available engine power: the maximum turn the aircraft can achieve and hold is its sustained turn performance. As the bank angle increases so does the g-force applied to the aircraft, this having the effect of increasing the wing loading and also the stalling speed. This effect is also experienced during level pitching maneuvers.

As stalling is due to wing loading and maximum lift coefficient at a given altitude and speed, this limits the turning radius due to maximum load factor.
With a wing loading of  the load factor is twice smaller and barely reaches 1g at 40,000 feet.

Aircraft with low wing loadings tend to have superior sustained turn performance because they can generate more lift for a given quantity of engine thrust. The immediate bank angle an aircraft can achieve before drag seriously bleeds off airspeed is known as its instantaneous turn performance. An aircraft with a small, highly loaded wing may have superior instantaneous turn performance, but poor sustained turn performance: it reacts quickly to control input, but its ability to sustain a tight turn is limited. A classic example is the F-104 Starfighter, which has a very small wing and high  wing loading.

That acceleration is caused by the inward horizontal component of the lift, where  is the banking angle. Then from Newton's second law,  Solving for R gives  The lower the wing loading, the tighter the turn.

Gliders designed to exploit thermals need a small turning circle in order to stay within the rising air column, and the same is true for soaring birds.  Other birds, for example those that catch insects on the wing also need high maneuverability.  All need low wing loadings.

Effect on stability
Wing loading also affects gust response, the degree to which the aircraft is affected by turbulence and variations in air density. A small wing has less area on which a gust can act, both of which serve to smooth the ride. For high-speed, low-level flight (such as a fast low-level bombing run in an attack aircraft), a small, thin, highly loaded wing is preferable: aircraft with a low wing loading are often subject to a rough, punishing ride in this flight regime.

Effect of development
A further complication with wing loading is that it is difficult to substantially alter the wing area of an existing aircraft design (although modest improvements are possible). As aircraft are developed they are prone to "weight growth"—the addition of equipment and features that substantially increase the operating mass of the aircraft. An aircraft whose wing loading is moderate in its original design may end up with very high wing loading as new equipment is added. Although engines can be replaced or upgraded for additional thrust, the effects on turning and takeoff performance resulting from higher wing loading are not so easily reconciled.

Water ballast use in gliders
Modern gliders often use water ballast carried in the wings to increase wing loading when soaring conditions are strong. By increasing the wing loading the average speed achieved across country can be increased to take advantage of strong thermals. With a higher wing loading, a given lift-to-drag ratio is achieved at a higher airspeed than with a lower wing loading, and this allows a faster average speed across country. The ballast can be ejected overboard when conditions weaken or prior to landing.

Design considerations

Fuselage lift

A blended wing-fuselage design such as that found on the General Dynamics F-16 Fighting Falcon or Mikoyan MiG-29 Fulcrum helps to reduce wing loading; in such a design the fuselage generates aerodynamic lift, thus improving wing loading while maintaining high performance.

Variable-sweep wing
Aircraft like the Grumman F-14 Tomcat and the Panavia Tornado employ variable-sweep wings. As their wing area varies in flight so does the wing loading (although this is not the only benefit). When the wing is in the forward position takeoff and landing performance is greatly improved.

Fowler flaps
Like all aircraft flaps, Fowler flaps increase the camber and hence the maximum value of lift coefficient (CLmax) lowering the landing speed. They also increase wing area, decreasing the wing loading, which further lowers the landing speed.

See also
Disk loading
Lift coefficient

References

Notes

Bibliography

Notes

External links
 
 

Aerodynamics
Aircraft configurations
Aircraft performance
Gliding technology